Hapa Road railway station is a railway station in Sabarkantha district, Gujarat. Its code is HPRD. It serves Himatnagar town. The station consists of one platform. The platform is not well sheltered. It lacks many facilities including water and sanitation.

References 

Ahmedabad railway division
Railway stations in Sabarkantha district